The Studio de musique ancienne de Montréal is a professional early music vocal ensemble based in Montreal, Quebec, Canada.

History
The group was co-founded in 1974 by the organ and harpsichord players Christopher Jackson, Réjean Poirier and Hélène Dugal, and became an important part of the early music revival in Montréal during the 1970s. Jackson became the ensemble's sole director in 1988. During the 1980s and 90s the group gave almost 90 concerts in France and Spain including performing and recording early music connected to Montréal and New France.

In 2015, Andrew McAnerney was appointed Artistic Director following the death of Christopher Jackson.

Concerts
The Studio produces an annual season of ten concerts in Montréal, and appears regularly at festivals throughout Canada and internationally. Notable collaborations have included Jordi Savall, Emma Kirkby, Ton Koopman, Skip Sempé, Guillemette Laurens, Matthias Maute, Noel Edison, Suzie LeBlanc and Daniel Taylor.

The ensemble is flexible drawing on a regular core of professional vocalists and instrumentalists. Season concerts vary from a small a cappella ensemble with 12–14 singers, through to large-scale combined orchestra and chorus with a chamber orchestra made up of period instruments.

Discography
Since its inception, the group has released 17 recordings, most recently on the ATMA Classique label.

 1981 Heinrich Schütz, Historia der Geburt Jesu Christi
 1993 Heinrich Ignaz Franz Biber, Musique des Vêpres pour solistes, chœur et orchestre
 1995 Henri Desmarets, Quatre motets lorrains
 1995 Histoires sacrées, Oratorios de Carisimi et Charpentier
 1995 Le chant de la Jérusalem des terres froides
 1997 Palestrina, Missa «Ut, Ré, Mi, Fa, Sol, La» and other sacred works
 1998 Heavenly Spheres
 2001 Montréal et les Indiens Abénakis (reissue of Le chant de la Jérusalem des terres froides)
 2002 Sacred Spaces, Motets by Gabrieli and Monteverdi for choir and instruments
 2003 Giovanni Gabrieli, Puer Natus Est
 2004 Arvo Pärt: Stabat Mater 
 2006 Marc-Antoine Charpentier
 2007 Rise, O my soul
 2007 Roma Triumphans
 2009 Orlande de Lassus, Lagrime di San Pietro
 2011 Musica Vaticana (ACD22508)
 2014 Terra Tremuit (ACD22653)
 2017 Orlande de Lassus, Laudate Dominum (ACD22746)

Awards

 1998 Juno Award - Nominated «Classical Album of the Year: Vocal or Choral Performance» for Palestrina, Missa «Ut, Ré, Mi, Fa, Sol, La» and other sacred works
 1999 Prix Félix - Won Disc of the Year for Heavenly Spheres.
 2000 Juno Award - Nominated «Classical Album of the Year: Vocal or Choral Performance» for Heavenly Spheres.
 2006 Prix Opus - Nominated Disc of the Year for Marc-Antoine Charpentier.
 2007 Prix Opus - Nominated Disc of the Year for Rise, O my soul.
 2008 Prix Opus - Won Concert of the Year for Jerusalem des terres froides.
 2010 Prix Opus - Won Concert of the Year for Le Faste de la France.
 2012 Prix Opus - Won Disc of the Year for Lagrime de San Pietro.
 2015 Juno Award - Nominated «Classical Album of the Year: Vocal or Choral Performance» for Terra Tremuit.
 2017 Prix Opus - Nominated Concert of the Year for Desires of the Soul.

References

External links
Official Website of the Studio de musique ancienne de Montréal

Canadian choirs
Félix Award winners
Musical groups established in 1974
Musical groups from Montreal
Early music choirs
1974 establishments in Quebec